Puckpool is a small coastal settlement on the outskirts of Ryde on the Isle of Wight. The area is best known for Puckpool Park, a park with an 18-hole putting green, 12 hole mini golf and two tennis courts. Puckpool Battery is located within the boundaries of the park; this is an old Palmerston Fort built in 1865.

Puckpool Point features a natural sheltered bay offering a large expanse of sand and a gently sloping beach which becomes very popular with tourists and local residents during the summer season. A wide pedestrian and cycle promenade leading to Puckpool Point lines the entire bay. Until December 2009 Southern Vectis operated standard bus service 16 which served the area between Ryde and Bembridge via Seaview and St Helens. However, no route currently serves the park and the arrangements for summer 2010 are not known. The Ryde Road Train is also operated during the summer, designed to transport tourists from Ryde to the beach and park at Puckpool.

References

External links
www.puckpoolteagardens.com Puckpool Tea Gardens at Puckpool Park

Villages on the Isle of Wight